Mark Knowles and Daniel Nestor were the defending champions, but lost in the first round to Lukáš Dlouhý and David Škoch.
 
Martin Damm and Leander Paes won in the final 6–4, 6–4 against Jonathan Erlich and Andy Ram.

Seeds

  Jonas Björkman /  Max Mirnyi (semifinals)
  Bob Bryan /  Mike Bryan (first round)
  Mark Knowles /  Daniel Nestor (first round)
  Paul Hanley /  Kevin Ullyett (quarterfinals)
  Martin Damm /  Leander Paes (champions)
  Jonathan Erlich /  Andy Ram (finals)
  Julian Knowle /  Jürgen Melzer (semifinals)
  Simon Aspelin /  Michael Kohlmann (first round)

Draw

Finals

Section 1

Section 2

External links
Association of Tennis Professionals (ATP) draw

Men's Doubles